The 1934 Centenary Gentlemen football team represented the Centenary College of Louisiana during the 1934 college football season. The team was led by first-year head coach Curtis Parker and competed in the Southern Intercollegiate Athletic Association (SIAA).

Schedule

References

Centenary
Centenary Gentlemen football seasons
Centenary Gentlemen football